As an abbreviation, CQL can refer to:
 Chess Query Language, a query language for interrogating chess databases
 Contextual Query Language (or common query language), for information retrieval
 Cassandra Query Language, for Apache Cassandra
 Classora Query Language, for Classora Knowledge Base
 Clinical Quality Language, a high-level, domain-specific language focused on clinical quality and targeted at measure and decision support artifact authors.
  CIM Query Language, a query language for the Common Information Model (CIM) standard from the Distributed Management Task Force (DMTF)
 Cypher Query Language, a declarative graph query language that allows for expressive and efficient querying and updating of a property graph.
 Confluence Query Language, for Atlassian Confluence
Chén Qíng Lìng (陈情令), The Untamed, a Chinese TV series